The University of Santo Tomas Junior High School (USTJHS), formerly called University of Santo Tomas High School, was established on June 6, 1928, and is one of the junior high school departments of the University of Santo Tomas (UST), located at Sampaloc, Manila, Philippines.  

USTJHS offers four years of high school, starting from Grade 7 to 10. The remaining two years of high school (Grade 11 and Grade 12) were transferred to the recently established University of Santo Tomas Senior High School.

Academics 
The UST Junior High School offers courses as mandated by the Department of Education on the Basic Education Curriculum. Integration and addition of certain courses are on the testing stage in line with the first ever accreditation attempt of the High School for its 80 years of existence. Currently, the UST Junior High School holds a Level II - Re-Accredited status by the Philippine Accrediting Association of Schools, Colleges and Universities (PAASCU).

Educational institutions established in 1928
Catholic secondary schools in Manila
University of Santo Tomas
University-affiliated schools in the Philippines
Education in Sampaloc, Manila
1928 establishments in the Philippines